75th Street (Grand Crossing) is an electrified commuter rail station along the Metra Electric Main Line in the Greater Grand Crossing neighborhood of Chicago, Illinois.

75th Street Station is the first station on the main line after the South Chicago Branch diverges. The station and the neighborhood that surrounds it were named for the Grand Crossing, an on-grade railway junction constructed in 1853 by mutual agreement between the Lake Shore and Michigan Southern Railway (New York Central) and the Illinois Central Railroad in settlement of a right-of-way feud. By 1912, this on-grade crossing was eliminated when the successor line to the LS & MS was elevated.  The now abandoned Nickel Plate Railroad tracks also crisscrossed the area. Another elevated crossing was constructed for the Chicago Skyway in 1958. As of 2011, these lines are owned by Metra, Canadian National Railway, and Norfolk Southern Railway. No parking is available for this station, however the Chicago Transit Authority does provide bus service here.

Bus connections
CTA
  30 South Chicago 
  75 74th/75th

References

External links 

75th Street entrance from Google Maps Street View

75th Street (Grand Crossing)
Former Illinois Central Railroad stations